Sam Chuk is a sub-district (tambon) of Sam Chuk District in the northern part of Suphanburi Province, central Thailand.

Tambon of Suphan Buri Province